Joseph Morrison is a football presenter known for his work on TEN Sports, TEN Action+,  SONY SIX and SSC which provides live football coverage to the MENA, Indian subcontinent, and other Asian regions.

He is best known as the former host of the popular show C2K (Countdown 2 Kickoff), with resident pundits former English goalkeeper John Burridge and former England international Carlton Palmer as well as guest appearances by former England international Trevor Sinclair and Indian captain and forward Sunil Chhetri. The show covered the UEFA Champions League, UEFA Europa League, League Cup, and I-League on TEN Action+.

Education
Joe Morrison was educated at Windsor Boys' School and Fettes College in Scotland, and graduated from Aberdeen University in 1993 with a degree in Agricultural Business Management.

BBC
Morrison joined BBC Newcastle in 1996 as a sports reporter and commentator. He famously took part in a charity stunt for BBC Children In Need which involved sitting on all 52,000 seats at St. James' Park stadium.

Senior producers quickly recognised Joe's relaxed on-air persona and fast tracked him into regional BBCTV, again in the sports field where his successes included football, rugby, European tour golf motor racing and horse racing.

Newcastle United
In 2001, Joe Morrison joined Newcastle United F.C. during one of the most successful periods in their recent history. Newcastle United were looking for a face to front up their newly launched club TV channel and New Media operation. Morrison was tasked with reporting on Newcastle's UEFA Champions League adventures as well as their domestic travails under manager Sir Bobby Robson. 
 
He was invited to do documentaries involving individual players in their own homes and environments including other parts of the world such as South America. His contacts and relationship's with everyone from Sir Bobby Robson to Alan Shearer, earned Joe the respect of his peers as well as an exclusive interview with Brazilian legend Pelé.

ART Arab radio and television
In 2005 Morrison was selected to front ART's newly launched English language Premier League channel 'Prime Sport'. It was the first time the Premier League had been broadcast in English across the Middle East.

During this time he hosted the Asian Football Confederation (AFC) Annual Awards held at the Emirates Palace in Abu Dhabi alongside FIFA President Sepp Blatter, which was broadcast across the Middle East and Asia.
 
Joe has worked with and been responsible for bringing to the Middle East, a long list of distinguished names from the world of football including Sir Alex Ferguson, Sir Bobby Robson, Paul Gascoigne, Ian Rush, Sir Bobby Charlton and Teddy Sheringham.

The Football Channel - Singapore
After ART lost the Premier League rights, Morrison moved to anchor the Premier League coverage for the new 'Football Channel' launched by Telecoms giant Starhub in Singapore. The live weekend broadcasts of the Premier League included a one off live show from Clarke Quay with Nigel Spackman and Peter Reid in which thousands of fans of Manchester United and Liverpool descended on the city centre for the special live screening.

Ten Sports/Ten Action
In his tenure with Ten Network Joe anchored various football shows as well as hosting live football broadcasts from Delhi and Kolkata for the UEFA Champions League. It was following a UEFA broadcast in September 2007 that Joe Morrison discovered that his father had died whilst he was on air. As host of C2K branded shows Morrison and his two resident guests Palmer and Burridge gained a cult following for their brand of football programmes. In 2014, Joe Morrison resigned as host of TEN Sports and TEN Action+ live football coverage along with resident guests Trevor Sinclair and John Burridge.

Sony Six

Joe Morrison was drafted in to anchor the FIFA World Cup 2014 coverage of host broadcaster SONY SIX from Mumbai accompanied by former players Robbie Fowler, Mikael Silvestre, Peter Crouch, and Peter Shilton. He also hosted the Euro 2016 for SONY SIX.
Morrison is anchor of the FIFA World Cup 2018 for Sony Pictures Networks on Sony Ten 2 HD, Sony Ten 3 HD, Sony Six HD, Sony ESPN HD, and Sony LIV.

Facebook Watch

Joe Morrison is the current host of Facebook Watch's coverage of La Liga in the Indian subcontinent. He usually asks questions to the experts about the game and reads out comments left by the viewer during the show.

References

External links
 

People educated at Fettes College
English television presenters
Living people
Year of birth missing (living people)
Place of birth missing (living people)